Charrière may refer to:

People:
 François Charrière (1893–1976), Swiss bishop of the Catholic Church
 Henri Charrière (1906–1973), French murderer and author
 Isabelle de Charrière (1740–1805), Dutch-Swiss writer
 Joseph-Frédéric-Benoît Charrière (1803–1876), Swiss-French surgical-instrument inventor

Other:
 Prissé-la-Charrière, municipality in western France
 Centre Sportif de la Charrière, sports stadium in La Chaux-de-Fonds, Switzerland
 The Charrière, alternate name for the unit French on the French catheter scale